Marco Aurélio Moreira (born 10 February 1952) is a Brazilian former professional football coach and player. Before his career as a coach, Marco Aurélio played as a midfielder, most notably for Fluminense.

Personal life
Marco Aurélio's son, Felipe Moreira, is also a coach.

Coaching statistics

Honours

Player 
 Fluminense
 Campeonato Carioca: 1973

 Coritiba
 Campeonato Brasileiro: 1985
 Campeonato Paranaense: 1986

Coach 
 Cruzeiro
 Copa do Brasil: 2000
 Copa Sul-Minas: 2002
 Supercampeonato Mineiro: 2002

References

External links

1952 births
Living people
Brazilian footballers
Association football midfielders
Campeonato Brasileiro Série A players
Fluminense FC players
Esporte Clube Vitória players
Esporte Clube Noroeste players
Associação Atlética Ponte Preta players
Esporte Clube São Bento players
Esporte Clube Taubaté players
Coritiba Foot Ball Club players
Brazilian football managers
Campeonato Brasileiro Série A managers
Campeonato Brasileiro Série B managers
J1 League managers
Associação Atlética Ponte Preta managers
Esporte Clube Vitória managers
Cruzeiro Esporte Clube managers
Sociedade Esportiva Palmeiras managers
Kashiwa Reysol managers
Figueirense FC managers
Clube Atlético Mineiro managers
Fortaleza Esporte Clube managers
América Futebol Clube (MG) managers
Clube Atlético Bragantino managers
Brazilian expatriate football managers
Brazilian expatriate sportspeople in Japan
Expatriate football managers in Japan